Voyenno-Antonovka is a large village in the Chüy Region of Kyrgyzstan. Its population was 20,182 in 2021.

Population

References

Populated places in Chüy Region